Beecher City is a village in Effingham County, Illinois, United States. Beecher City is part of the Effingham, IL Micropolitan Statistical Area.  The population was 428 at the 2020 census. Beecher City was founded in 1872.

Geography
Beecher City is located in northwestern Effingham County at  (39.187030, -88.785737). Illinois Route 33 passes through the village, leading east  to Effingham.

The village is home to the Beecher City Unit 20 School District. The district has a junior/senior high school as well as a grade school serving grades K-6 located in the town. Recently the neighboring town of Shumway housed a grade school for grades K-2, but it closed down at the start of the 2010-2011 school year. The town has a post office, bank, a village paper, and a popular gas station, known as "the station". This small village is also complete with a volunteer fire department, and several churches. 

Since, 2020 Beecher City has started using the community park for more events, such as mud drags, tractor pulls, farmers markets, and other events. There has been a new restaurant that opened called the Pit Stop.

Demographics

As of the census of 2000, there were 493 people, 191 households, and 132 families residing in the village. The racial makeup of the village was 99.39% White, 0.41% Native American, and 0.20% from two or more races.

There were 191 households, out of which 38.7% had children under the age of 18 living with them, 49.7% were married couples living together, 13.1% had a female householder with no husband present, and 30.4% were non-families. 26.7% of all households were made up of individuals, and 12.6% had someone living alone who was 65 years of age or older.  The average household size was 2.58 and the average family size was 3.11.

In the village, the population was spread out, with 32.3% under the age of 18, 8.5% from 18 to 24, 27.8% from 25 to 44, 16.6% from 45 to 64, and 14.8% who were 65 years of age or older.  The median age was 32 years. For every 100 females, there were 88.2 males.  For every 100 females age 18 and over, there were 82.5 males.

The median income for a household in the village was $27,500, and the median income for a family was $33,583. Males had a median income of $25,156 versus $19,125 for females. The per capita income for the village was $12,779.  About 8.0% of families and 18.4% of the population were below the poverty line, including 23.0% of those under age 18 and 20.0% of those age 65 or over.

Education
Beecher City High School made the Chicago Sun-Times "Top 100 High Schools in Illinois" in 2009 and 2010.

References

   

Villages in Effingham County, Illinois
Villages in Illinois
Populated places established in 1881
1881 establishments in Illinois
